Priest Jovica's Rebellion was a Christian peasant rebellion that broke out in the Derventa and Gradačac nahiye, in Bosnian Posavina, in 10–13 March 1834, organized by Orthodox priest Jovica Ilić from Banja Luka, stationed in Derventa at the time. The rebels were predominantly Orthodox (Serbs), but some Catholics (Croats) also joined.

Jovica Ilić corresponded with other Serbian Orthodox leaders and also sent letters to Serbian Prince Miloš Obrenović. He rallied other priests (such as Pavle Tvrtković, Milo Vitković and Stevan Avramović of Orašje) and the population around Podnovlje. Notable priests Tvrtković and Vitković who had fled to Serbia prior to the outbreak of the rebellion, had met in Požarevac with Prince Miloš whom they asked to take up the side of the Christians in Bosnia at the Porte. Those who stayed in Serbia prepared from Šabac a rebellion in the nahiye of Banja Luka, Bijeljina, Tuzla and Derventa. Tvrtković, who was Jovica's closest associate, organized people in Serbia, and at first had the support of Prince Miloš.

The rebellion broke out in the nahiye of Derventa and Gradačac in Bosnian Posavina. Odžak was set on fire by the rebels. 300 bey soldiers were killed. It was quickly suppressed by the Ottoman government. Some 600 Serbs in Derventa were killed in the aftermath. Some of the population migrated to Slavonia, part of the Habsburg monarchy. The Austrian government registered 326 immigrants to Austria, of whom 66 did not return to Bosnia. Jovica was wounded and fled across the Sava to the Habsburg monarchy. Decapitated rebel heads were put on display at the Gradačac fort walls. The Ottomans accused Jovica that he wanted to "make Serbia out of Bosnia" with the rebellion. After the collapse of the rebellion, Prince Miloš secretly received, hid and protected some of the rebel leaders and protested at the Porte due to the atrocities and penalties which had caused the uprising, and unrest not only in Bosnia but in Serbia also. Several thousand peasants were received in Serbia, especially from Bosanska Krajina, who sought refuge from feudal terror; these were settled in Podrinje and Šumadija. The rebellion echoed to Bosanska Krajina, where the Second Mašići Rebellion broke out. A similar peasant rebellion broke out in Niš.

In Majevac, near Doboj, a Serbian Orthodox convocation was held which marked 170 years since the rebellion.

See also
Jančić's rebellion

References

Sources

Books

Journals

Rebellions against the Ottoman Empire
Ottoman period in the history of Bosnia and Herzegovina
History of the Serbs of Bosnia and Herzegovina
1834 in Europe
Conflicts in 1834
Ottoman–Serbian Wars
Serb rebellions
1834 in the Ottoman Empire
Rebellions in Bosnia and Herzegovina
19th-century rebellions
March 1834 events
Religion in Bosnia and Herzegovina during Ottoman period